Eduardo Nava may refer to:
 Eduardo Nava (athlete), Mexican sprinter
 Eduardo Nava (tennis), American tennis player
 Eduardo Nava Bolaños, Mexican politician